The final qualification repechage tournament for women's rugby sevens at the 2020 Summer Olympics was held on 19–20 June 2021 at Stade Louis II in Monaco. The tournament was originally scheduled for a year earlier, but was postponed until 2021 due to the global COVID-19 pandemic.

Twelve women's teams were eligible to compete in the repechage tournament, as high placing teams from the six continental Olympic qualification events. Jamaica was a late withdrawal from the tournament due to travel difficulties presented by the global COVID-19 pandemic, which reduced the number of teams competing to eleven.

France and Russia were the two   best teams in the repechage, each going through the tournament undefeated. They claimed the two qualifying berths on offer for the women's sevens tournament at the Tokyo Olympics.

Teams

 Notes:

Pool stage 
The teams were drawn into three pools with each team playing against all opponents in their own pool. Due to the late withdrawal of Jamaica, all matches involving them were recorded as a bye for their opponents in Pool B.

Pool A

Pool B

Pool C

Combined standings
The top two teams from each pool, plus the two best third-placed teams on the combined pool standings progressed to the knockout stage. The seedings were based on (a) highest pool placing, then (b) most competition points awarded (for a win, draw or loss) in the respective pool standings, and (c) greatest difference between points scored and conceded across all pool matches played.

Knockout stage
With two Olympic places available, the top eight women's teams from the pool stage were seeded into two separate four-team brackets. The winners of each bracket qualified for the women's sevens tournament at the Tokyo Olympics.

Qualifier semi-finals

Qualifier finals

Placings

See also
 2020 Men's Rugby Sevens Final Olympic Qualification Tournament

References

Final Olympic Qualification Tournament
Olympic Qualification Tournament
Rugby sevens
Rugby sevens
Rugby sevens